Miguel Antonio de Benavides y Piedrola (1643 – February 1713) was a Roman Catholic prelate who served as Bishop of Cartagena (1681–1713).

Biography
Miguel Antonio de Benavides y Piedrola was born in Jaén, Spain in 1643.
On 3 March 1681, he was appointed during the papacy of Pope Innocent XI as Bishop of Cartagena.
He served as Bishop of Cartagena until his death in February 1713.

Episcopal succession
While bishop, he was the principal consecrator of:
Diego Ladrón de Guevara, Bishop of Panamá (1689);
Ignacio de Urbina, Archbishop of Santafé en Nueva Granada (1690);

and the principal co-consecrator of:

References

External links and additional sources
 (for Chronology of Bishops) 
 (for Chronology of Bishops) 

17th-century Roman Catholic bishops in New Granada
18th-century Roman Catholic bishops in New Granada
Bishops appointed by Pope Innocent XI
Roman Catholic bishops of Cartagena in Colombia
1643 births
1713 deaths